MES's (Mormugao Educational Society's) College of Arts and Commerce] is a college in Zuarinagar, just alongside the port city of Vasco-da-Gama, Goa on the western coast of India. It was founded by Vasant S. Joshi. Murgaon Education Society was established in 1971 with the noble goal of providing educational facilities at Vasco-da-Gama and in other parts of Murgaon Taluka.

The college is listed in the top 150 colleges of the country by National Institutional Ranking Framework, MHRD, Government of India.

MES offers Higher Secondary Education in Science, Commerce, Arts and Vocational courses.  It also offers under-graduation courses in Arts, Commerce, BCA, and BBA and post-graduation course in M. Com. It is one of the younger colleges of Goa, but caters to students from a wide area around the Mormugao taluka and the town of Vasco-da-Gama.

It is an affiliated college of the Goa University.

Dr. Manasvi M. Kamat is the Principal of the college.

Dr. Maria do Ceu Rodrigues, former principal of the College has been involved with the Lokniti/CSDS and has been the Goa state coordinator for the National Election Study 2004 apart from being engaged with a UGC Project on "Fishing in Goa, Economic, Social and Political Aspects."

Library
The College has a well equipped library which stocks more than 20, 000 books and also has a wide collection of journals, magazines, newspapers and educational directories.

NSS and NCC
MES College boasts of an active NSS (National Service Scheme) and NCC (National Cadet Corps) wing which contributes to the social and community welfare.

Student life
The College has a Student Council elected by the student body which conducts activities for the students throughout the year.

Counseling Centre
MES College has a counseling Centre which takes care of student health and mental well-being.

References

Universities and colleges in Goa
Buildings and structures in South Goa district
Education in South Goa district
1971 establishments in Goa, Daman and Diu
Educational institutions established in 1971